The Grübelekopf (also spelled Grüblekopf or Gribellakopf) is a mountain of the Samnaun Alps, located on the border between Austria and Switzerland.

The Grübelekopf is the northernmost point of the Austrian-Swiss border in the Samnaun Alps and the tripoint between the Samnaun valley, the Visnitztal and the Grübeletal.

References

External links
 Grübelekopf on Hikr

Mountains of the Alps
Mountains of Graubünden
Mountains of Tyrol (state)
Austria–Switzerland border
International mountains of Europe
Mountains of Switzerland
Two-thousanders of Switzerland